Tyler Island is a bar island in Kanawha County, West Virginia on the Kanawha River. The island lies within the city boundaries of South Charleston.

See also 
List of islands of West Virginia

River islands of West Virginia
Islands of Kanawha County, West Virginia